"It's Here" is a song by English singer-songwriter Kim Wilde, released as the first single from her seventh album, Love Moves (1990), and is also her first release of the new decade. Wilde was the most charted and biggest-selling British female soloist of the 1980s, and had ended that decade with the release of her biggest-selling album, Close, and its accompanying string of hit singles. Although the new single and album did not match that success, "It's Here" became a moderate hit in some countries. Both the single and its B-side, "Virtual World" (an exclusive non-album track) were extended for the 12" and CD-single formats.

Critical reception
Bob Stanley from Melody Maker commented, "It's here! It's Kim! It's springy and sounds a little like Kirsty MacColl with a lively electro backing and a smart bit of Spanish guitar midway through! It's surprisingly listenable!" A reviewer from Music & Media said, "The perfect combination. A mellow, melancholic tune, a committed vocal delivery and a good dance groove rapped up in a slick production." David Giles from Music Week wrote, "Wilde takes a leaf out of the Sydney Youngblood book, blending a splash of flamenco guitar against a bold dance rhythm. Considerably stronger than her other recent singles with a powerful chorus and an expansive production job." Stuart Maconie  from NME said, "Some nice synthesiser tinkles appealed to my frankly mid-'80s sensibilities. Some strangulated vocal effects, however, suggests that Kim may want to be regarded as a serious artist in her own right."

Charts

Weekly charts

Year-end charts

References

1990 singles
1990 songs
Kim Wilde songs
MCA Records singles
Songs written by Kim Wilde
Songs written by Ricky Wilde